Modest Ivanovich Bogdanovich (russ. Модест Иванович Богданович; 26 August / 7 September 1805, Sumy – 25 July / 6 August 1882, Oranienbaum, Saint Petersburg) was a Russian lieutenant-general and military historian. A nephew of the poet Ippolit Bogdanovich, Modest became an officer in 1823 and served in the war against the Poles. In 1839 he became professor of military history and strategy at the St Petersburg Military Academy.

Works
 Bonaparte's Campaign in Italy of 1796. St. Petersburg (1859–60)
 Rumjanzow's, Potemkin's and Sawyrow's campaigns in Turkey. (1852)
 History of the Great Patriotic War of 1812. 2 volumes. St. Petersburg (1861)
 History of the War of 1813. St. Petersburg (1863–69)
 History of the War of 1814 and the Deposition of Napoleon I. 2 Volumes. St. Petersburg (1865)
 History of the Rule of Alexander I. 6 vols. St. Petersburg (1869–71)
 The oriental war of 1854–56. 4 vols. St. Petersburg (1876)

1805 births
1882 deaths
Imperial Russian Army generals
Russian military historians
Russian people of the November Uprising